Midniters may refer to:

Thee Midniters, an American Chicano rock group from the 1960s
The Midnighters, an American rhythm and blues group from the 1950s, led by Hank Ballard

See also
Midnighters (disambiguation)